Bang Na Tai is a khwaeng (subdistrict) of Bang Na District, in Bangkok, Thailand. In 2020, it had a total population of 47,638 people.

References

Subdistricts of Bangkok
Bang Na district